William Trench III (October 21, 1831 - April 12, 1896) was the reeve of Richmond Hill, Ontario from 1875–1879 and 1881 - 1882.

Born in Dunbar, Scotland, Trench came to Elgin Mills, Ontario with his family in 1842.  Trench learned the blacksmith trade from his father and set up a shop in Richmond Hill in 1857.  In 1866, Richmond Hill set up its first fire brigade, and Trench was chosen the first fire chief.

Trench Carriage Works
Trench later owned a carriage factory named the "Trench Carriage Works" in Richmond Hill that was one of the village's leading employer during the 1870s through 1890s. Trench manufactured buggies, wagons, stagecoaches, and carriages used in the mid to late 19th Century Ontario, but would go out of business in the 1920s due to the movement towards automobiles

Trench Street in Richmond Hill is named in his honour.

Trench died in Richmond Hill in 1896.

The buildings that housed the business remains in use as retail shops at 10117, 10119 and 10123 Yonge Street (southeast corner at Yonge Street and Lorne Avenue).

References 

1831 births
1896 deaths
Mayors of Richmond Hill, Ontario
Scottish emigrants to pre-Confederation Ontario
People from Dunbar
William Trench III#Trench Carriage Works
Immigrants to the Province of Canada
Coachbuilders of Canada